Lau is a surname. Notable people with the surname include:

 Andy Lau (born 1961), Hong Kong singer and actor
 Andrew Lau (born 1960), Hong Kong director and producer
 Anthony To-Ming Lau (born 1943), Hong Kong born Canadian mathematician
 Carina Lau (born 1965), Hong Kong-Canadian actress and director
 Chak Sing Lau, Hong Kong professor of rheumatology
 Charley Lau (1933–1984), American catcher and hitting coach in Major League Baseball
 Christel Lau (born 1944), German field hockey player
 Constance Lau, Singaporean actress and model
 David Lau (born 1966), Ashkenazi Chief Rabbi of Israel
 Evelyn Lau (born 1971), Canadian writer
 Finn Lau (born 1993), Hong Kong political activist
 Gordon Lau (1941–1998), American politician
 Hans E. Lau (1879–1918), Danish astronomer
 Hawick Lau (born 1974), Hong Kong actor
 Henry Lau (born 1989), Chinese singer in South Korean subgroup Super Junior-M
 Jean Marie du Lau (1738–1792), Archbishop of Arles, killed during the French Revolution
 Jer Lau (born 1992), member of Hong Kong boy band MIRROR
 Laurence Lau (born 1954), American actor
 Lau Lee Peng (1952-2000), Singaporean killer
 Sean Lau (born 1964), Hong Kong actor
 Susanna Lau (born 1983), aka "Susie Bubble", British fashion blogger and journalist
 Wesley Lau (1921–1984), American film and television actor
 Yisrael Meir Lau (born 1937), former Orthodox Ashkenazi Chief Rabbi of Israel

See also
 Liu (劉), a common Chinese family name transliterated Lau in Cantonese
 Lau clan, one of the Saraswat Brahmin clans of Punjab